Michael Jarvis (1938-2011) was a race horse trainer.

Michael Jarvis may also refer to:

 Mike Jarvis (born 1945), basketball coach
 Mike Jarvis (The Bill)